Suncuk is a village in the Düzce District of Düzce Province in Turkey. Its population is 366 (2022). Most villagers are ethnically Laz.

References

Villages in Düzce District
Laz settlements in Turkey